Shamkhal may refer to:

Shamkhal (title), title of the rulers of Kumukh and Tarki in Dagestan
Shamkhal, Russia, an urban-type settlement in the Republic of Dagestan, Russia
Shamkhal, Iran